Maysky is a rural locality (a settlement) in Maysky Selsoviet of Mazanovsky District, Amur Oblast, Russia. The population was 84 as of 2018. There are 3 streets.

Geography 
Maysky is located 10 km from the right bank of the Zeya River, 113 km northeast of Novokiyevsky Uval (the district's administrative centre) by road. Ivanovsky is the nearest rural locality.

References 

Rural localities in Mazanovsky District